Matt Senk is an American college baseball coach who is currently the head coach of the Stony Brook Seawolves. Senk has held the head coaching position at Stony Brook since prior to the 1991 season. Under Senk, Stony Brook has won America East Conference baseball tournaments in 2004, 2008, 2010, 2012, 2015, and 2019, appearing in the NCAA tournament each of those seasons. In 2012, Stony Brook won the Coral Gables Regional and advanced to the Baton Rouge Regional to face LSU. After defeating LSU in a three-game series, the team moved on to the College World Series for the first time in program history. It was the first time that a school from the Northeast had reached the College World Series since 1986.

Senk won the 2012 America East Conference Coach of the Year Award and went on to win the NCBWA National Coach of Year Award.

Career 
Senk graduated from John Glenn High School in 1976 and attended Cortland State for college, where he played catcher. In college, Senk started for three years and was a two-time All-SUNYAC selection and the team's Most Valuable Player in his senior year. He earned his master's degree in physical education at Adelphi University.

Senk coached high school teams at St. Agnes Cathedral and Kellenberg Memorial on Long Island before leaving his position to start coaching Stony Brook's Division III baseball team in 1991. Senk recruited shortstop Joe Nathan of Pine Bush, New York, to play for Stony Brook through a Pine Bush assistant coach that was a former college teammate of his. Nathan would become Senk's first recruit to reach the major leagues when he debuted for the San Francisco Giants as a pitcher in 1999.

In 2004, Senk won his first America East tournament to advance to the NCAA tournament regionals for the first time in the program's Division I history. Senk won his first America East Coach of the Year in 2011 after guiding the Seawolves to their first conference regular season championship and ending the season 42–12 while going 22–2 in conference play. In 2012, Senk guided the Seawolves to their fourth NCAA Tournament regional after earning the most wins in the country; the Seawolves would win the Coral Gables Regional as the four-seed and then upset the LSU Tigers in the Baton Rouge Super Regionals to reach the first College World Series in program history, while also becoming the first Northeast school to accomplish the feat since 1986 and the first New York school since 1980. Finishing the season at 52–15, Senk won the NCBWA National Coach of the Year award.

In September 2019, Senk was given an extension through the 2024 season.

In 2022, Senk was inducted into the Suffolk County Sports Hall of Fame. The America East Conference suspended Senk for the first nine games of the 2022 season "in response to an incident that occurred during the 2021 season in which Coach Senk acted contrary to NCAA Baseball Rules and America East Bylaws governing conduct."

On March 8, 2023 with a 15–5 victory over LIU, Senk won his 900th game, becoming the seventh active Division I baseball head coach to win 900 games at one school.

Head coaching record
Below is a table of Senk's yearly records as an NCAA head baseball coach.

See also
List of current NCAA Division I baseball coaches

References

Living people
Cortland Red Dragons baseball players
Adelphi University alumni 
Stony Brook Seawolves baseball coaches
Baseball coaches from New York (state)
Year of birth missing (living people)
High school baseball coaches in the United States